Dilkhushaar, also known as dal badam chakki, is a dish of the Marwari cuisine prepared and sold in Jodhpur.

It mainly consists of almond, mogar (gram flour), mawa (condensed milk), ghee (clarified butter) and sugar.

Rajasthani desserts